Rouge is the French word for "red" and may refer to:

Compounds 
 Rouge (cosmetics), a cosmetic used to color the cheeks and emphasize the cheekbones
 Jeweler's rouge or iron(III) oxide
 Rouging, a form of corrosion applicable to stainless steel

People and characters
 Adrien de Rougé (1782-1838), French statesman
 Aurélie Rouge (born 1992), Martiniquais footballer
 Caesar Rougé (born 2002), French footballer
 Emmanuel de Rougé (1811-1872), French Egyptologist 
 Guillaume le Rouge (1385-1450), Dutch musician
 Rouge (rapper), South African female rapper
 Roger Rouge (born 1914), Swiss sailor

Characters 
 Rouge (Power Stone), a character in Power Stone media
 Rouge (Ranma½), a character in Ranma ½ media
 Rouge the Bat, a character in Sonic the Hedgehog media
 Rouge, the titular character from the 2016 Chinese TV show Rookie Agent Rouge
 Riana Rouge, the titular character from the adult action adventure game Riana Rouge
 Madame Rouge, a DC Comics supervillainess

Places 
Rõuge, a settlement in Estonia
Rõuge Parish, Estonia
Rouge, Toronto, Ontario, Canada; a neighbourhood in Toronto
Rougé, Châteaubriant, Châteaubriant-Ancenis, Loire-Atlantique, Pays de la Loire, France
La Rouge, Val-au-Perche, Ceton, Mortagne-au-Perche, Orne, Normandy, France
Mount Rouge, Graham Land, Antarctic Peninsula, Antarctica; a mountain
Mont Rouge, Pennine Alps, Switzerland; a mountain
Rouge River (disambiguation)
Fort Rouge (disambiguation)
Eau Rouge (Red Water), Belgium; a stream
Zone Rouge, France; a zone of devastation after WWI

Facilities and structures
The Rouge, Ford's production complex on the Rouge River in Dearborn, Michigan, USA
Château Rouge, Bas-Oha, Wanze, Liège Province, Wallonia, Belgium; a chateau
Eau Rouge corner, Spa-Francorchamps racetrack, Belgium; from the Belgian Grand Prix
Rouge National Urban Park, Ontario, Canada

Media
 Rouge FM, a Canadian French-language radio network
 Rouge (newspaper), a weekly newspaper published by the Revolutionary Communist League in France

Film and television 
 Rouge (film), a 1988 Hong Kong film
 Rouge (film journal), an online film journal
 Rouge (TV series), an MTV series about an Asian girl band

Music 
 La Rouge (tour), a concert tour by Red Velvet

Bands
 Rouge (German duo), an offshoot of the group Arabesque
 Rouge (group), a Brazilian girl group (2002–2006, 2017–2019)
 Rouge, an American band performing with Desmond Child

Albums
 Rouge (Rouge album), a 2002 album by pop group Rouge
 Rouge (Fredericks Goldman Jones album), 1993
 Rouge (Louis Sclavis Quintet album), 1992
 Rouge (Yuna album), a 2019 album by the Malaysian singer Yuna
 La Rouge (album), a 2005 album by Torngat

Songs
 "Rouge" (song), by Naomi Chiaki and covered by various artists
 "Rouge", a song on Miles Davis' 1957 album Birth of the Cool

Organizations, groups, companies 
 Air Canada Rouge, a discount airline subsidiary of Air Canada
 Parti rouge, an 1800s political party of Quebec
 Café Rouge, a British restaurant chain

Sport 
 Rouge (football) or single, a score of one point in Canadian football
 Rouge, better known as Rush (wrestler) (born 1988), Mexican professional
 A method of scoring in the Eton field game
 A historical method of scoring in Sheffield Rules football

Other uses 
ROUGE (metric), an evaluation metric used in natural language processing
Rouge de l'Ouest, a breed of sheep
Rivina humilis, the rouge plant

See also

 
 Rouging
 Red (disambiguation)
 Rougemont (disambiguation) and Rougemount
 Cap-Rouge (disambiguation)
 Morne Rouge (disambiguation)
 Moulin Rouge (disambiguation)
 Maison Rouge (disambiguation) (